Tsuneo Noto (born 20 February 1944) is a Japanese alpine skier. He competed at the 1964 Winter Olympics and the 1968 Winter Olympics.

References

1944 births
Living people
Japanese male alpine skiers
Olympic alpine skiers of Japan
Alpine skiers at the 1964 Winter Olympics
Alpine skiers at the 1968 Winter Olympics
Sportspeople from Hokkaido
People from Otaru
20th-century Japanese people